Greco-Roman religion may refer to:
Ancient Greek religion
 Hellenistic religion
 Mystery religions, initiatory cults of the Greco-Roman world
 Interpretatio graeca, the translation or interpretation of Greek and Roman deities in comparison to other myths and religions
 Religion in ancient Rome, which encompasses various religions, including Greek, practiced by peoples under Roman rule
 Classical mythology

See also
 Greco-Roman world
 Magic in the Greco-Roman world
 Gallo-Roman religion
 Classical tradition